The Latvian Second League is the third tier of football in Latvia and is organised by the Latvian Football Federation.

Competition format

Regional stage
There are 16 clubs in the Second League. There are 2 regions, West and East, with both divisions containing 8 teams which must play home and away games against their regional opponents. From each region, 4 teams advance to the promotion round, whereas the other 4 teams advance to the relegation round. This stage of the league is typically contested from April to August.

Promotion/relegation stage
The promotion round involves additional matches between the best 8 teams in the league, allowing two of the best teams to be promoted to the First League at the conclusion of the season. Additionally, the third-finishing team contests a two-legged playoff against the third-from-bottom-team in the First League, with the winner of the playoff securing an additional First League berth for the next season.

The relegation round, contested between the bottom 4 teams of each of the two divisions, sees the bottom 4 of those total 8 teams relegated to the Third League.

Past Second League winners

References

External links 
 Latvian Football Federation website

3
Third level football leagues in Europe